Jean Van Leer (12 April 1919 – 16 February 2003) was a Belgian field hockey player. He competed at the 1952 Summer Olympics and the 1956 Summer Olympics.

References

External links
 

1919 births
2003 deaths
Belgian male field hockey players
Van Leer family
Olympic field hockey players of Belgium
Field hockey players at the 1952 Summer Olympics
Field hockey players at the 1956 Summer Olympics
People from Ixelles
Field hockey players from Brussels